Cedar Lake East Beach is an urban beach in Minneapolis, Minnesota, United States. It is managed by the Minneapolis Park and Recreation Board and located on the east side of Cedar Lake. Formerly known as Hidden Beach, the area used to be obscured down a forested path, which contributed to its rise of prominence in the 1960s and 1970s as enclave of counter-culture. After receiving attention for several decades due to illicit activities and safety concerns, the beach underwent a contentious "family-friendly" shift following efforts by the park board in the late 2010s. The location was already deemed extremely family friendly, patrons often brought their small children and infants to experience a community without judgement and to meet people from all walks of life. Unfortunately, the neighboring residents were not so welcoming of the "all walks of life" aspect of the community that had grown at Hidden Beach.

History

Railway: 1860s to 1980s
Before 1867, Cedar Lake had a much different shape, and most of the woods surrounding Cedar Lake East Beach, particularly to the south east, were areas of water and wetland. In 1867, the St. Paul and Pacific Railway (a precursor to the BNSF Railway) built an earthen causeway through what was then a large bay on the east side of Cedar Lake. In 1871, the Minneapolis and St. Louis Railroad joined the St. Paul and Pacific Railway, running parallel tracks along the causeway. Slowly, by dumping cinders and other material, the part of the bay east of the causeway was filled in. The Minneapolis and St. Louis Railroad (became the St. Paul, Minneapolis, and Manitoba and moved its tracks from the east side to the north side of the lake 1883) then used the new land to create a major train yard. In 1878, a large scale ice cutting operation known as Cedar Lake Ice Company was founded on the lake’s north eastern shore, which shipped ice to places as far away as St. Louis, Missouri. By 1900, Dingley’s boat house occupied the end of a thin peninsula on the eastern side of the lake, which eventually widened and became the site of Cedar Lake East Beach.

As a result, what remained of the East Bay (west of the old earthen rail corridor) completely dried up. Despite the large railway operations going on nearby, the land surrounding Cedar Lake’s eastern shore was sold to build houses, hotels, and other such structures between 1895 and 1975. Unlike today, houses occupied both sides of Upton Avenue South. In the 1950s, the area was used as a city dump. Much of the road construction debris from the interstate highway projects wound up as mounds of rubbish along the eastern shoreline of Cedar Lake. The area quickly overgrew with cottonwood trees, resulting in the forested hills to the southeast of the beach.

Counter-culture: 1960s to mid-late 2000s
Sometime in the 1960s, the beach came to prominence. At the time, the beach was only a small grassy clearing by the shore, led to by a deer path-sized trail. It became known locally as an unofficial nude beach. Most of the railway yard closed by the mid-1980s, and the tracks and buildings were removed. In 1988, residents in the surrounding neighborhood purchased the land to the west of Upton Avenue South, between the lake and the road, and turned it into a city park with a vision of establishing a nature park. Instead, what established was a thriving community of local Minneapolis residents: many eclectic and artistic individuals of all races, who built a strong culture and welcoming group for daytime visitors that almost felt like a commune. While people did not live on site, many would spend the entire day or arrive after getting off work to join their community in beach games (some local to the area, like the legendary sport "Rock Golf" created by a longstanding elder member of the community), relaxation, music, shared food and drink, and the general attitude that all people from all ages and all walks of life were welcome and would be treated as family. The intergenerational aspect of the community was unique and something to be preserved, teens and seventy year old "old timers" who had been patrons of the area since the 60's and 70's were often found engaged in deep conversation or on the same teams for beach games and cards. Unfortunately, the polar opposite of the word "preservation" played out in every aspect imaginable - from destroying and removing the culture, to police brutalizing beachgoers who had committed minor offenses or often no crime at all, and decimating the natural beauty and endangered/threatened wildlife that once flourished there. The park police's continued harassment and abuse, the nearby wealthy neighborhood citizens dislike for counterculture and people who were "different", all this led to the downfall of the once beautiful place that used to be lovingly named Hidden Beach.

Park conversion: post 2010
In 1995, residents in the neighborhood surrounding the beach used money from the Neighborhood Revitalization Plan funds to hire off-duty police officers to patrol the beach more frequently. This was done officially through the Kenwood Isles Area Association. The reasons behind this stemmed from a concern over illegal activity at the beach. Residents claimed that they were concerned with their safety and wanted to crack down on nudity, marijuana use, parties, and the daytime commune-vibe. Some believed that a lack of an official entrance to the beach represented a major obstacle for the park police to patrol and gain access freely. Some patrons of the beach claimed that the wealthy residents in the surrounding neighborhood wanted to reduce or eliminate use by non-residents. The police reported that crime was not any higher at the beach than it was at many other official beaches in Minneapolis. The Kenwood Isles Area Association pushed the Minneapolis Park and Recreation Board for a solution. Yet, others used another excuse, claiming the pervasiveness of an invasive species of Buckthorn which had grown over large areas of the park. In 2004, the park board decided to "renovate" the park due to both the safety and ecologic concerns. That summer, the park board widened paths and clear cut areas leading to the beach by clearing out buckthorn; as well as all non-invasive trees, species, and endangered plant life. The park board removed additional vegetation in subsequent years and continues to do so. The vegetation obscured the view of the beach from the street, which made it considerably more difficult for park police members looking for a means of promotion by meeting their quotas - by handing out tickets for dog related offenses, occasional partial female nudity, and beer drinkers. Police brutality was a common occurrence in the 2000's. Crime in the local residential area was often mistakenly attributed to the beachgoers, who also suffered from car break-ins or robberies after leaving the beach and entering the residential area where cars could be parked, instead of the city bus lines that began in the poorest areas of town and ended in this upscale wealthy neighborhood. Violent crime and theft were not known to occur on the beach itself or amongst its patrons. 

In 2007, community members held a session of meetings to address the growing concern over activity at the beach. Neighbors voted down a proposal to build a large parking lot. However, they voted in favor of graveling the path to the beach, which required clear cutting of additional trees and endangered plant life, to allow for service and police vehicles to reach the beach area. Other renovations approved included installation of picnic tables, a grill, a permanent police-only parking lot on the beachside itself, and a lifeguard stand. The initial wood life guard stand burned down, which some suspect was deliberate by vandals, and was replaced with a metal stand.

In popular culture
The cover for the 1985 album New Day Rising by Hüsker Dü was shot at Hidden Beach.

Photo gallery

See also
Cedar Lake Trail

References

4. Elizabeth Crandall, Primary Source Reference Material

External links

Minneapolis Park and Recreation Board: Cedar Lake East Beach
Historical Photos of Cedar Lake (c. 1890–1900)

Beaches of Minnesota
Parks in Minneapolis
Landforms of Hennepin County, Minnesota